Moon Kwang-eun (born November 9, 1987 in Gwangju, South Korea) is a South Korean pitcher who plays for the LG Twins of the KBO League.

External links
Career statistics and player information from Korea Baseball Organization

Moon Kwang-eun at SK Wyverns Baseball Club 

1987 births
Living people
South Korean baseball players
SSG Landers players
KBO League pitchers
Sportspeople from Gwangju